Edificio Avenida Central is an office skyscraper located on Avenida Rio Branco in the Centro neighbourhood of Rio de Janeiro, Brazil. It stands at a height of 110 metres and has 34 floors. It was completed in 1961 in the International style of architecture, which was the dominant architectural style at the time of the building's construction.

References 

Skyscrapers in Rio de Janeiro (city)
Skyscraper office buildings in Brazil
Office buildings completed in 1961